Graecophaedusa is a monotypic genus of gastropods belonging to the family Clausiliidae. The only species is Graecophaedusa sperrlei.

The species is found in Greece.

References

Clausiliidae